The Bradley BA 100 Aerobat is an American aerobatic homebuilt aircraft that was designed and produced by Bradley Aerospace of Chico, California. When it was available the aircraft was supplied as a kit for amateur construction.

Design and development
The BA 100 Aerobat features a cantilever low-wing, a single-seat enclosed cockpit under a bubble canopy, fixed tricycle landing gear, or optional conventional landing gear, and a single engine in tractor configuration.

The all-metal aircraft is made from sheet aluminum. For aerobatics the BA 100 is stressed to +/-9g

Factory kit options included conventional landing gear and a STOL kit. The manufacturer estimated the construction time from the supplied kit as 150 hours.

Operational history
By 1998 the company reported that 33 kits had been sold and 28 aircraft were flying.

In December 2013 three examples were registered in the United States with the Federal Aviation Administration.

Specifications (BA 100 Aerobat)

See also
List of aerobatic aircraft

References

External links
Photo of a Bradley Aerobat

Aerobat
1990s United States sport aircraft
1990s United States ultralight aircraft
Single-engined tractor aircraft
Low-wing aircraft
Homebuilt aircraft
Aerobatic aircraft